The 1983 Virginia Slims of Nashville was a women's tennis tournament played on outdoor hard courts at the  Maryland Farms Racquet Club in Nashville, Tennessee in the United States that was part of the Ginny Series of the 1983 Virginia Slims World Championship Series. The tournament was held from February 28 through March 6, 1983. Second-seeded Kathleen Horvath won the singles title.

Finals

Singles

 Kathleen Horvath defeated  Marcela Skuherská 6–4, 6–3
 It was Horvath's 1st title of the year and the 2nd of her career.

Doubles

 Rosalyn Fairbank /  Candy Reynolds defeated  Alycia Moulton /  Paula Smith 6–4, 7–6
 It was Fairbank's 1st title of the year and the 4th of her career. It was Reynolds' 1st title of the year and the 9th of her career.

Notes

References

External links
 1983 Ginny Circuit advertisement (PDF)
 Ginny of Nashville fact sheet (PDF)

Virginia Slims of Nashville
Virginia Slims of Nashville
Virginia Slims of Nashville
Virginia Slims of Nashville
Virginia Slims of Nashville
Virginia Slims of Nashville
Women's sports in Tennessee